Ian David Robinson (11 March 1947 – 3 April 2016) was a Zimbabwean cricket umpire who officiated in 28 Test Matches and 90 One Day Internationals (ODIs).

Robinson started his umpiring career in 1975, was promoted to first-class level in 1978 and remained there for 31 seasons. He made his international umpiring debut in Zimbabwe's inaugural Test, against India at Harare in 1992, was a member of the ICC International Panel and umpired in 3 World Cups.

In 2008, he announced his retirement from top-level umpiring to take up the role of ICC Regional Umpires' Performance Manager for the Africa region.

On 3 April 2016, Robinson died from lung cancer at the age of 69 in Harare.

See also
 List of Test cricket umpires
 List of One Day International cricket umpires

References

External links

1947 births
2016 deaths
Zimbabwean Test cricket umpires
Zimbabwean One Day International cricket umpires
British emigrants to Zimbabwe